The 2015 European Rowing Championships were held in Poznań, Poland, between 29 and 31 May 2015.

Medal summary

Men

Three members of the Russian M4x crew were under investigation for anti-doping violations in 2014.

Women

Medal table

Participating nations
Athletes from 36 countries participated in the championships.

  (14)
  (4)
  (2)
  (30)
  (4)
  (9)
  (1)
  (29)
  (18)
  (6)
  (7)
  (40)
  (52)
  (49)
  (15)
  (9)
  (14)
  (2)
  (3)
  (11)
  (2)
  (4)
  (41)
  (10)
  (40)
  (3)
  (22)
  (45)
  (3)
  (13)
  (16)
  (15)
  (1)
  (4)
  (9)
  (44)

References

External links
 Official website

European Rowing Championships
2015
2014 European Rowing Championships
European Rowing Championships
Sport in Poznań
21st century in Poznań
Rowing competitions in Poland